I Used to Be an Animal is a studio album by English singer Eric Burdon, released in 1988 by Metronome Records. It was his first studio album in almost four years. It was recorded at Indigo Ranch in Malibu, California.

Following his autobiography, I Used to Be an Animal, but I'm All Right Now (1986), it was his comeback. "Going Back to Memphis", "Run for Your Life", "Don't Give a Damn" and "I Will Be with You Again" were released as singles worldwide. Most of the albums' titles are featured on many compilations.

Burdon mixed several pop and rock-influenced styles like jungle, new wave, disco, alternative rock, hip hop, glam metal, electronica and blues.

Track listing
All songs were composed by Eric Burdon and Steve Grant; except where noted.

Side A
 "I Used to Be an Animal" (Geoff Bastow, Eric Burdon, Michael Jackson-Clark) – 3:19
 "The Dream" (Burdon) – 1:33
 "American Dreams" – 3:36
 "Going Back to Memphis" – 4:12
 "Leo's Place" – 4:07

Side B
"Run for Your Life" – 4:15
 "Don't Give a Damn" (Eric Burdon, Michael Jackson-Clark, Amin Sabol) – 5:00
 "Living in Fear" (Geoff Bastow, David John, Jackson Rich) – 4:24
 "I Will Be With You Again" – 4:36

Bonus tracks
 "Sixteen Tons
 "New Orleans Rap"

Personnel
Musicians
 Eric Burdon – vocals
 Chuck Findley – trumpet
 Andy Giddings – keyboards
 Jamie Glaser – guitar
 Anna Lena Karlsson – backing vocals
 Randy Kerber – piano
 Nick Lane – trombone
 John Liotine – trumpet
 Peter Michael – percussion
 Jamie Moses – guitar
 Adrian Shepard – drums
 Brad Silwood – alto saxophone, tenor saxophone
 Greg Smith – baritone saxophone
 Stephanie Spruill – backing vocals
 Steve Stroud – bass guitar
 Maxine Willard Waters – backing vocals
 Jimmy "Z" Zavala – harmonica, saxophone

Production
 Geoff Bastow – arranger
 Eric Burdon – producer
 Steve Grant – producer
 Chuck Johnson – engineer
 Richard Kaplan – engineer
 Carlo Nasi – producer

References

External links
 

1988 albums
Eric Burdon albums